The Lygaeidae are a family in the Hemiptera (true bugs), with more than 110 genera in four subfamilies. The family is commonly referred to as seed bugs, and less commonly, milkweed bugs, or ground bugs. However, while many of the species feed on seeds, some feed on sap (mucivory) or seed pods, others are omnivores and a few, such as the wekiu bug, are carnivores that feed exclusively on insects. Insects in this family are distributed across the world, including throughout North America. The family was vastly larger, but numerous former subfamilies have been removed and given independent family status, including  the Artheneidae, Blissidae, Cryptorhamphidae, Cymidae, Geocoridae, Heterogastridae, Ninidae, Oxycarenidae and Rhyparochromidae, which together constituted well over half of the former family. 

The bizarre and mysterious beetle-like Psamminae were formerly often placed in the Piesmatidae, but this is almost certainly incorrect. Their true affiliations, however, are not entirely resolved to satisfaction.

Distinguishing Characteristics
Lygaeidae are oval or elongate in body shape and have four-segmented antennae. Lygaeidae can be distinguished from Miridae (plant bugs) by the presence of ocelli, or simple eyes. They are distinguished from Coreidae (squash bugs) by the number of veins in the membrane of the front wings, as Lygaeidae have only four or five veins.

Subfamilies and selected genera
An incomplete list of Lygaeidae genera is subdivided as:
subfamily Ischnorhynchinae Stål, 1872
 Crompus Stål, 1874
 Kleidocerys Stephens, 1829
subfamily Lygaeinae Schilling, 1829
 Lygaeus Fabricius, 1794
 Oncopeltus Stål, 1868
 Melanocoryphus Stål, 1872
 Spilostethus Stål, 1868
 Tropidothorax Bergroth, 1894
subfamily Orsillinae Stål, 1872
 Nysius Dallas, 1852
 Orsillus Dallas, 1852
subfamily † Lygaenocorinae
Unplaced genera
 Lygaeites Heer, 1853

The Pachygronthinae Stål, 1865 (type genus Pachygrontha Germar, 1840) may be placed here or elevated to the family Pachygronthidae.

Gallery

References

External links
Lygaeidae, BugGuide

 
Heteroptera families